Orpheus is an American rock band originally from Worcester, Massachusetts, that enjoyed popularity in the 1960s and early 1970s, featuring lead singer/songwriter Bruce Arnold. They had two charted Billboard Hot 100 singles, "Brown Arms in Houston" and "Can't Find the Time," both released on MGM Records.
Original band members, including Stephen Martin, Jack McKennes, Eric "Snake" Gulliksen, and Harry Sandler, along with Robert Emmet Dunlap and Kathi Taylor, performed for many years in New England as Orpheus Reborn.

Biography

Discography

Albums 
 Orpheus (1968)
 Ascending (1968)
 Joyful (1969)
 Orpheus (1971)
 The Best of Orpheus (Ace Big Beat Release, 1995)
 The Very Best of Orpheus (2001)
 The Complete Orpheus (2001)
 Orpheus Again (BAM! Release, 2010)

Charted singles 

 Can't Find the Time 
 Brown Arms in Houston

References

 Marin Independent Journal - "Orpheus makes its West Coast debut, 45 years later"
 Telegram.com - "Orpheus Finds The Time To Beautifully Evoke The 1960s"
 Marin Independent Journal - Press Play: Bruce Arnold's "Orpheus Again"
 GoLocalWorcester.com - "Orpheus Gears Up For Mechanics Hall Homecoming - May 9th"
 Fuse Music Interview: 60′s Sunshine Pop Pioneer Bruce Arnold "Finds the Time" for Orpheus

External links

Official Orpheus Website
Official Orpheus Reborn Website
Music Museum of New England
MIT Interview with Orpheus Reborn

American pop rock music groups
American soft rock music groups
American folk rock groups
Rock music groups from Massachusetts
Musical groups from Worcester, Massachusetts
MGM Records artists
Bell Records artists